Snehal Ambekar (born 31 July 1972) is Shiv Sena Politician from Mumbai. She was the former Mayor of Mumbai.  She first Dalit woman to hold the position. There has been controversy regarding her use as mayor of a red beacon on top of her car.

Positions held
 2012: Elected as corporator in Brihanmumbai Municipal Corporation
 2012: Member of Architecture Committee Brihanmumbai Municipal Corporation
 2014: Elected as Mayor of Brihanmumbai Municipal Corporation
 2017:Elected as corporator in Brihanmumbai Municipal Corporation.

References

External links
 Shivsena Home Page
 Brihanmumbai Municipal Corporation website

Living people
Mayors of Mumbai
Marathi politicians
Shiv Sena politicians
Place of birth missing (living people)
1972 births
Maharashtra local politicians